Ochakovo may refer to:
 Ochakovo, a station on the Kalininsko-Solntsevskaya line of the Moscow Metro
 Ochakovo-Matveevskoe, an administrative district (raion) of Western Administrative Okrug, and one of the 125 raions of Moscow, Russia
 Ochakovo, a Russian beverage producer.